David Roumieu (born 15 October 1981) is a retired French professional rugby union player. He played as a hooker.

References

External links
Ligue Nationale De Rugby Profile
European Professional Club Rugby Profile
Bayonne Profile

French rugby union players
1981 births
Living people
Rugby union players from Toulouse
Castres Olympique players
Aviron Bayonnais players
Stade Rochelais players
Biarritz Olympique players
Stade Toulousain players
Rugby union hookers
US Montauban players